Kamisama Minarai: Himitsu no Cocotama is a Japanese anime television series animated by OLM, Inc., based on both the series of toys and Media Franchise created by Bandai Namco Holdings. The series focuses on Kokoro Yotsuba, a fifth grader who accidentally witness a small god born from her treasured color pencil set, and must be bound through a contract in order to keep his existence a secret. The series was directed by Norio Nitta and written by Michihiro Tsuchiya (Mirmo De Pon!, PriPara, Cross Game) with character designs by Shinobu Ookawa. The series aired on all TXN stations in Japan from October 2015 to June 2018, replacing Tamagotchi! on its initial timeslot. The series uses a few elements from Shinto and Christianity, regarding the Cocotamas.

A second series, sequel titled Kira Kira Happy Hirake! Cocotama was broadcast from September 2018 to September 2019.

Story

Kokoro Yotsuba is a fifth-grader who lives on the seaside town of Aozora, who is clumsy yet also takes good care of her belongings. Living alongside her brother, she once understood what her grandmother said to her, regarding that "everything has a soul" and that things should be cherished. One day, a strange egg was born from her colored pencil she cherished the most, revealing to as Luckytama, a Cocotama. However, he is found by Kokoro after returning from school and for him to exist, he asks Kokoro to sign a "Secret Contract" on which she cannot reveal the secret of the Cocotamas to the world and also must take care of him with great love and care. Now with Luckytama living with his new human friend, Kokoro must make sure she never reveal not tell their secret while meeting other Cocotamas who either befriend her or cause her trouble.

Production
The series and toy line were both simultaneously unveiled at the 2015 Tokyo Toy Fair on June 18, 2015, and scheduled for an October release. The business partners for the series were also present at the unveiling, including Bandai President and CEO Kazunori Ueno, TXN's Anime Bureau member Yukio Kawasaki, OLM Representative Toshiaki Okuno, Lantis's Yoshie Terunari, Bandai's Hiroshi Kawata, and Narabe Ayumi of Kodansha. The series and toy line is planned to be a multimedia franchise aimed at girls, revealing the series' concept of "cherishing things you care for" relating to the title and theme. Kodansha confirmed in a press release that the series would be included as a serialized kid's manga in Tanoshī Yōchien, and that the toys are released in September 2015.

Media

Merchandise
The , on which the anime is based on was released on September 19, 2015, with its first set including a small Luckytama figure and a decorative dollhouse. The toy line focuses on decorating its own dollhouse and expanding it with other sets, which can be connected to the main dollhouse itself. The figures were also released the same month, in which each Cocotama figure can be placed inside its plastic egg shell and opened by "cracking" the egg to reveal the figure.

As well with other Bandai Namco-related franchises, the series is also a cross-media franchise and has other merchandising goods related such as stationery, plush toys and novelty items.

Anime

The anime based on the toyline, produced by OLM, aired on October 1, 2015 and ended on June 28, 2018, replacing Tamagotchi! Tama Tomo Daishū GO! on its initial timeslot. The opening song from episodes 1 to 76 is titled  and from episode 77 to 126 is titled , both performed by Erika. From episode 127 onwards, the title song is titled  by Kaede Hondo and Megumi Han. The first ending theme is titled  by Aki Toyosaki featuring Megumi Han, Yumi Kakazu, Ryoka Yuzuki, Rikako Aikawa and Michiyo Murase, the second ending theme is titled  by Kaede Hondo and Megumi Han, the third is titled  by Kaede Hondo featuring Megumi Han, Aki Toyosaki, Yumi Kakazu, Ryoka Yuzuki, Rikako Aikawa, Michiyo Murase, Ayumi Fujimura, Yuri Shiratori, Fumiko Orikasa and Ayaka Nanase while the fourth is titled  by Megumi Han, Aki Toyosaki and Saki Fujita. The series's music is composed by Ryosuke Nakanishi (Sakura Trick, High School DxD, Kuroko's Basketball). The first official soundtrack of the series was released on October 26, 2016 in Japan. The second ending theme was later covered by BNK48 member Praewa Suthamphong for the Thai release of the anime. An 8-episode special program following the end of the first series, only titled Kamisama Minarai: Himitsu no Cocotama: Natsu Da! Ōhashagi Special, aired from July 5, 2018 to August 30, 2018.

Kadokawa currently released the series in several DVD box sets in Japan under the Media Factory label. 9 Box sets were currently released.

Broadcasts
TV Tokyo officially streams the series in Japan as part of the Ani.TV Lineup on October 8, 2015. Bandai Channel also starts streaming the series in Japan as well in the video site Nico Nico Douga and in NTT DoCoMo's video streaming service Docomo Anime Store. Starting in April 2016, the timeslot of the series is changed to make way for Aikatsu Stars! premiere. Reruns of the series later aired in Disney Channel Japan starting May 1, 2016 through CS Broadcasts and later on in TV Tokyo's Animeteleto Streaming Service. Also, it aired in foreign countries such as South Korea via Disney Channel Korea beginning on August 1, 2016, Hong Kong via ViuTV on February 22, 2017, Thailand via Channel 3 on November 4, 2017, Taiwan via MOMO Kids on November 12, 2017 and MENA via Spacetoon on November 12, 2017.

Film
A theatrical film adaptation of series, titled Eiga Kamisama Minarai: Himitsu no Cocotama: Kiseki o Okose ♪ Tepple to Dokidoki Cocotama Kai was released on April 28, 2017 during Japan's Golden Week. It was released alongside a Tamagotchi! short film for the franchise' 20th anniversary. The film's opening theme is titled  by Erika with Megumi Han,  Aki Toyosaki, Yumi Kakazu, Ryoka Yuzuki, Rikako Aikawa and Michiyo Murase while the ending theme is titled  by Kaede Hondo. The movie's official soundtrack was released by Lantis on April 28, 2017.

Reception
The toy franchise topped sales numbers in Japan, with more than 1 million in total sales in December 2015. It again topped its previous record, with the total toys sold being 1.4 million. In May 2018, the Cocotama Dolls was sold and shipped more than 5 Million pieces while the Cocotama House shipped more than 1 million pieces.

The first movie debuted in 10th place at the Japanese Box Office during Golden Week across 151 theaters in Japan. On its South Korean theatrical release, it was watched by more than 13.6 million people in 3 weeks.

Notes

References

External links
  
 Official anime website  (TV Tokyo) 
 Series Entry on Animeteleto 
 

 
2010s toys
2017 anime films
Animated television series about animals
Anime with original screenplays
Bandai Namco franchises
Mass media franchises
OLM, Inc.
TV Tokyo original programming
Toy brands
Toy figurines